Camp Misty Mount is located in Catoctin Mountain Park near Thurmont, Maryland.  The camp was built by the Works Progress Administration labor program in the development of what was then known as the Catoctin Mountain Recreational Development Area, and comprises 35 rustic log buildings including sleeping cabins, administrative buildings and lodges.  All were built between 1935 and 1938.  The buildings are a simplified version of the National Park Service Rustic style. Misty Mount is used as a public cabin-camping facility.

Misty Mount is also known as Camp 1: Camp 2 is Camp Greentop and Camp 3, originally called Camp Hi-Catoctin and located at a much higher elevation, became Camp David.

Camp Misty Mount Historic District was listed on the National Register of Historic Places in 1989.

References

External links

, including undated photo, at Maryland Historical Trust
 Camp Misty Mount: A Place for Regrowth, a National Park Service Teaching with Historic Places (TwHP) lesson plan

Historic districts in Frederick County, Maryland
South Mountain Range (Maryland−Pennsylvania)
Historic districts on the National Register of Historic Places in Maryland
National Register of Historic Places in Frederick County, Maryland
Recreational Demonstration Areas
Rustic architecture in Maryland
Works Progress Administration in Maryland
National Park Service Rustic architecture